Heart Lake Conservation Area (HLCA) occupies 169 hectares (418 acres) in the Etobicoke Creek watershed, within the City of Brampton, Ontario. It is owned and managed by the Toronto and Region Conservation Authority (TRCA).

HLCA’s diverse ecosystem includes Heart Lake, the headwaters for Spring Creek, a wetland complex, one of the largest individual blocks of forest in the Etobicoke Creek watershed, and surficial geology of glacial till and river deposits.

HLCA offers many activities to the public, including hiking, fishing, swimming, Treetop Trekking and more. The conservation area is open to the public from the end of April to Thanksgiving weekend, weather permitting.

The opening of a Medicine Wheel Garden was celebrated May 20, 2010.  It came as a vision from a male elder of the Anishnawbe Nation.  Toronto and Region Conservation Authority, Peel Aboriginal Network, Heart Lake Community Action Area Group and the City of Brampton, created the Medicine Wheel Garden (Gitigaan Mashkiki).

Hiking Trails 
Heart Lake Conservation Area is home to five hiking trails, with 11 km of trails in total.  Pokemon Go stops have been added to TRCA parks including Heart Lake.

These include:

In spring 2017, a new fitness trail was added with strength training and enhanced stretching.

Heart Lake 
Heart Lake is the main focus of HLCA, offering users many water-based activities including fishing, boating and canoeing.

Fishing 
HLCA offers visitors the ability to fish lakeside or from boats.

Heart Lake is stocked with rainbow trout, raised by TRCA at Glen Haffy Conservation Area’s Fish Hatchery each year. Other fish found in Heart Lake include bass and sunfish.  During the summer, Heart Lake is one of the hosts for the Learn to Fish Program.

Boating 
Visitors at HLCA can enjoy boating activities on Heart Lake. HLCA offers boat rentals on-site.

Cross Country Running 
The ROPSSAA Cross Country Championships are hosted at Heart Lake annually towards the end of October.

In 2012, Heart Lake was the location of the OFSAA Cross Country Championships.

Pool and Splash Pad 
The Wild Wetland Splash and Pool Facility at HLCA includes an 840 sq metre, beach-entry swimming pool, with the deep end being 8 ft. in depth. Along with a heated swimming pool, the water facility also includes over thirty wetland-themed water features.

Treetop Trekking 

Treetop Trekking Brampton is an aerial ropes and zip-line course located within HLCA. The course offers visitors 6 aerial courses, 7 zip lines and over 65 aerial games to enjoy.

The course became a part of HLCA in 2013.

References

Geography of Brampton
Conservation areas in Ontario
Tourist attractions in Brampton
Protected areas of the Regional Municipality of Peel
Zip-lining